Denis Dupont (born 4 January 1993) is a Belgian racing driver currently competing in the USA in Michelin Pilot Challenge in TCR. He previously raced in WTCR, TCR International Series, GT3 in Blancpain Sprint and Endurance championship, TCR BeNeLux Touring Car Championship, GT4 European Series Northern Cup and NASCAR Whelen Euro Series amongst others.

Racing career
Dupont began his career in 2008 in Karting, he continued in karting until 2012. In 2014 he switched to the NASCAR Whelen Euro Series, he finished the season fifth in the Elite 2 class championship standings that year, having taken two victories. For 2016 he switched to the TCR BeNeLux Touring Car Championship, driving a SEAT León TCR for the Belgian RACB National Team partnering Sam Dejonghe. With the pair taking two victories. He continued in the series for 2017, again partnering Dejonghe. The pair having so far taken one victory. In 2017 he also took part in the GT4 European Series Northern Cup, partnering Jérôme Demay for the first three rounds. He scored a podium after leading his whole stint. He did not continue the season with the team and was replaced by Julien Darras.

In September 2017 it was announced that he would race in the TCR International Series, driving an SEAT León TCR for Comtoyou Racing. He qualified 3rd in Dubai but had bad luck during the races and suffered from punctures.

In February 2018, Dupont was confirmed as Comtoyou Racing's driver in an Audi RS3 LMS for 2018 WTCR campaign.  He will score 2 podiums in the World championship that year. 

In late 2022, it was announced Rockwell Autosport Development would be returning to the 2023 Michelin Pilot Challenge with a two car entry. Dupont was announced to drive the #15 car, With teammates Eric Rockwell and Nick Looijmans.

Racing record

Complete TCR International Series results
(key) (Races in bold indicate pole position) (Races in italics indicate fastest lap)

† Driver did not finish the race, but was classified as he completed over 90% of the race distance.

24 Hours of Zolder results

Complete World Touring Car Cup results
(key) (Races in bold indicate pole position) (Races in italics indicate fastest lap)

† Driver did not finish the race, but was classified as he completed over 90% of the race distance.

NASCAR
(key) Bold - Pole position awarded by fastest qualifying time (in Race 1) or by previous race's fastest lap (in Race 2). Italics - Fastest lap. * – Most laps led.  ^ – Most positions gained.

Whelen Euro Series - Elite 2

References

External links
 
 

1993 births
Living people
TCR International Series drivers
Belgian racing drivers
NASCAR drivers
Audi Sport drivers
World Touring Car Cup drivers
Ombra Racing drivers
Blancpain Endurance Series drivers
W Racing Team drivers
Michelin Pilot Challenge drivers
21st-century Belgian people
Comtoyou Racing drivers
GT4 European Series drivers
TCR Europe Touring Car Series drivers